"False Alarm" is a song written by British singer Becky Hill and produced by Norwegian DJ and tropical house record producer Matoma. Written at a writing camp in Copenhagen with the acclaimed songwriter Kara DioGuardi, the song was released as a digital download on 24 June 2016 through Warner Music Group. The song peaked at number 28 on the UK Singles Chart and number 52 on the Irish Singles Chart. It also charted in Belgium, Norway and Sweden. Although originally included on Matoma's 2016 debut album Hakuna Matoma, it was also later included on his second album, One in a Million (2018).

Music video
A music video to accompany the release of "False Alarm" was first released onto YouTube on 5 August 2016 at a total length of three minutes and thirty-five seconds.

Track listing

Charts

Weekly charts

Year-end charts

Certifications

Release history

References

2016 singles
2016 songs
Matoma songs
Becky Hill songs
Warner Music Group singles
Tropical house songs
Songs written by James Newman (musician)
Songs written by Kara DioGuardi
Songs written by Cutfather
Songs written by Peter Wallevik
Songs written by Becky Hill
Songs written by Matoma
Songs written by Daniel Davidsen